Bryan Alfonso Véjar Utreras (born 14 July 1995) is a Chilean footballer that currently plays for Chilean Primera División side Palestino as a defender.

Club career
He made his professional debut playing for Huachipato on May 11, 2013.  On that day, his team defeated Santiago Wanderers 3 goals to 1. 

On August 4, 2016, it was officially announced his departure to Colo Colo, by petition of the current coach Pablo Guede. On August 4, 2021, he moved to Palestino after ending his contract with Colo-Colo.

International career
Véjar was one of the players selected by former Chilean coach Jorge Sampaoli to spar with the Chile National team for the World cup Brazil 2014. After, he represented Chile U20 at the 2015 South American U-20 Championship, making one appearance.

On 2020, he took part of a training microcycle of the Chile senior team.

Honours
Colo-Colo
 Primera División (1): 2017 Transición
 Copa Chile (2): 2016, 2019
 Supercopa de Chile (2): 2017, 2018

References

External links
 

1995 births
Living people
People from Talcahuano
People from Concepción Province, Chile
People from Biobío Region
Chilean footballers
Chile international footballers
Chile under-20 international footballers
Chile youth international footballers
Colo-Colo footballers
C.D. Huachipato footballers
Club Deportivo Palestino footballers
Chilean Primera División players
Association football defenders